The men's halfpipe competition in snowboarding at the 2022 Beijing Winter Olympics was held on 9 February (qualification) and 11 February (final), at the Genting Snow Park in Zhangjiakou. Ayumu Hirano of Japan, the 2014 and 2018 silver medalist, finally won a gold Olympic medal. Scotty James of Australia improved from the 2018 bronze to the 2022 silver. Jan Scherrer of Switzerland won the bronze, his first Olympic medal. 

The field also included the defending champion, Shaun White, who won this event in 2006, 2010, and 2018. This was White's last Olympics as he announced his upcoming retirement before the games began. White qualified to the finals where he finished fourth, repeating his 2014 performance. 

At the 2021–22 FIS Snowboard World Cup, only three halfpipe events were held before the Olympics. Ayumu Hirano was leading the ranking, followed by Ruka Hirano and Scherrer. Yūto Totsuka was the 2021 world champion, with James and Scherrer being the silver and bronze medalists, respectively. Totsuka was also the 2019 X-Games winner in super-pipe, ahead of James and Ruka Hirano.

Qualification

A total of 25 snowboarders qualified to compete at the games. For an athlete to compete they must have a minimum of 50.00 FIS points on the FIS Points List on January 17, 2022 and a top 30 finish in a World Cup event or at the FIS Snowboard World Championships 2021. A country could enter a maximum of four athletes into the event.

Results

Qualification
 Q — Qualified for the Final

The top 12 athletes in the qualifiers move on to the medal round.

Final

Controversy 
During Ayumu Hirano's second finals run, he completed a "spectacular frontside triple cork to become the first person ever to land the trick at an Olympics." NBC commentator Todd Richards, a former snowboarder, immediately announced that "no one will touch that run tonight... that is going to be a 98." He would go on to add, "He destroyed this halfpipe. That run was something that we may never see again from anyone else. Unbelievable. Level raised. By such a large margin. They are going to give him a score that is going to be just out of this world." However, judges scored the run a 91.75, leaving him in second behind Scotty James. 

Immediately on-air, NBC's Richards blasted the judges, proclaiming “Ahhh what? What? Is there a mistake? There’s no way, there is no way. A 91.75? ...as far as I’m concerned, the judges just grenaded all their credibility." He went on to add, "It's unbelievable that this is even happening. It's a travesty to be completely honest with you. I am irate right now. Someone call the authorities, there’s been a robbery." People online began to dub this controversy "triple-gate". X games silver medalist Nikko Landeros tweeted that Hirano "just got robbed... this should never happen in the Olympics... what a disgrace." Ultimately, Hirano secured the gold medal on his third run by scoring a 96.00 by performing a triple cork and a 1440.

References

Men's snowboarding at the 2022 Winter Olympics